Queer Science: The Use and Abuse of Research into Homosexuality is a 1996 book by neuroscientist Simon LeVay on the scientific explanations for homosexuality.

Bibliography

External links 

 

1996 non-fiction books
English-language books
Sexual orientation and science